Chestnut Street Methodist Church may refer to 

in the United States (by state )

Chestnut Street Methodist Church (Louisville, Kentucky), listed in the National Register of Historic Places in Downtown Louisville, Kentucky
Chestnut Street Methodist Church (Portland, Maine), listed in the National Register of Historic Places in Portland, Maine